Kiss is a 2019 Indian Kannada-language romantic comedy drama film directed by A. P. Arjun and produced by V. Ravi Kumar under his home banner, Rashtrakuta Pictures. It is the second Kannada-language movie after A 2nd Hand Lover (2015) to be inspired by the 2004 South Korean film 100 Days with Mr. Arrogant. The film features debutantes Viraat and Sree Leela in lead roles. Actress Mayuri Kyatari dubbed for Shree Leela's dialogues.

The film completed a 100-day theatrical run and became a commercial hit at the box office.

Plot
Nandini is an architecture student who damages the car of a multi-millionaire named Arjun. Not able to pay for the damage, she is asked to sign an agreement to work for Arjun for 72 days or give him two kisses. Nandini prefers the work option and, accordingly, cleans his house, takes care of his dog, serves his friends at parties, and so on. An incident makes Nandini realize that Arjun is not the arrogant guy she thinks he is, and she develops feelings for him. As their 72-day agreement draws to a close, she keeps her feelings to herself and departs Arjun's house in sadness. After a few days, Arjun realizes his love for Nandini and follows her to Ooty, where he proposes to her in a park, but she rejects him. Determined to win her heart, Arjun pursues Nandini, who proceeds to give him the cold shoulder, even humiliating him in the hospital, where she is recuperating after a vicious attack by goons. Arjun leaves, heartbroken. The next day, he is about to depart Ooty, but Nandini catches up to him and confesses that she was testing him to see if he truly loved her. Arjun and Nandini then share their first kiss.

Cast and characters
 Viraat as Arjun, a multi-millionare
 Sree Leela as Nandini, Arjun's love interest
 Chikkanna as Jaggi, Arjun's best friend
 Sadhu Kokila as Musthafa, flower merchant
 H. G. Dattatreya as Nandini's PG owner

Soundtrack
The soundtrack was scored by V. Harikrishna and his son, Adi Hari, marking the latter's music production debut.

Sequel
Director A. P. Arjun has said he is planning to make a sequel to Kiss.

References

External links
 

2019 films
Indian romance films
2010s Kannada-language films
Indian remakes of South Korean films